iTunes Festival: London 2012 may refer to:

The 2012 iTunes Festival
iTunes Festival: London 2012 (Andrea Bocelli EP)
iTunes Festival: London 2012 (Natalie Duncan EP)
iTunes Festival: London 2012 (Rebecca Ferguson EP)
iTunes Festival: London 2012 (Haim EP)
iTunes Festival: London 2012 (Labrinth EP)
iTunes Festival: London 2012 (One Direction EP)